Alexei Sopin (born 4 March 1987) is a Russian former professional ice hockey player who is currently serving as the General manager with HC Dynamo Moscow of the Kontinental Hockey League (KHL).

Sopin has played in four separate stints including in the KHL during the 2012–13 season.

After his 6th year with Dynamo, Sopin while still contracted was granted free agent status from the KHL following the 2016–17 season, due to the club's debt on July 4, 2017. He left to promptly sign a one-year contract with HC Sibir Novosibirsk the following day on July 5, 2017.

References

External links

1987 births
Living people
People from Zhukovsky, Moscow Oblast
Avangard Omsk players
HC Dynamo Moscow players
Metallurg Novokuznetsk players
Russian ice hockey forwards
HC Sibir Novosibirsk players
Torpedo Nizhny Novgorod players
Sportspeople from Moscow Oblast